William Ayling (26 July 1878 – 3 October 1960) was an Australian rules footballer who played with Collingwood in the Victorian Football League (VFL).

Notes

External links 

		
Bill Ayling's profile at Collingwood Forever

1878 births
1960 deaths
Australian rules footballers from Victoria (Australia)
Collingwood Football Club players
Port Melbourne Football Club players